In topology, especially algebraic topology, the cone of a topological space  is intuitively obtained by stretching X into a cylinder and then collapsing one of its end faces to a point.

Definitions 
Formally, the cone of X is defined as:

In other words, it is the result of attaching the cylinder  by its face  to a point  along the projection .  

That is, the topological cone agrees with the geometric cone for compact spaces when the latter is defined. However, the topological cone construction is more general.

Examples
Here we often use a geometric cone ( where  is a non-empty compact subspace of Euclidean space). The considered spaces are compact, so we get the same result up to homeomorphism.

 The cone over two points {0, 1} is a "V" shape with endpoints at {0} and {1}.
 The cone over a closed interval I of the real line is a filled-in triangle (with one of the edges being I), otherwise known as a 2-simplex (see the final example). 
 The cone over a polygon P is a pyramid with base P.
 The cone over a disk is the solid cone of classical geometry (hence the concept's name).
 The cone over a circle given by

is the curved surface of the solid cone:

This in turn is homeomorphic to the closed disc.
More general examples:
 The cone over an n-sphere is homeomorphic to the closed (n + 1)-ball.
 The cone over an n-ball is also homeomorphic to the closed (n + 1)-ball.
 The cone over an n-simplex is an (n + 1)-simplex.

Properties

All cones are path-connected since every point can be connected to the vertex point. Furthermore, every cone is contractible to the vertex point by the homotopy

.

The cone is used in algebraic topology precisely because it embeds a space as a subspace of a contractible space.

When X is compact and Hausdorff (essentially, when X can be embedded in Euclidean space), then the cone  can be visualized as the collection of lines joining every point of X to a single point. However, this picture fails when X is not compact or not Hausdorff, as generally the quotient topology on  will be finer than the set of lines joining X to a point.

Cone functor 
The map  induces a functor  on the category of topological spaces Top. If  is a continuous map, then  is defined by 
, 
where square brackets denote equivalence classes.

Reduced cone
If  is a pointed space, there is a related construction, the reduced cone, given by 

With this definition, the natural inclusion  becomes a based map. This construction also gives a functor, from the category of pointed spaces to itself.

See also

Cone (disambiguation)
Suspension (topology)
Desuspension
Mapping cone (topology)
Join (topology)

References

Allen Hatcher, Algebraic topology. Cambridge University Press, Cambridge, 2002. xii+544 pp.  and 

Topology
Algebraic topology